Escadron de Transport 52 Tontouta is a French Air and Space Force squadron located at La Tontouta International Airport, New Caledonia which operates the Aérospatiale SA 330 Puma and the CASA/IPTN CN-235.

See also

 List of French Air and Space Force aircraft squadrons

References

French Air and Space Force squadrons